Hilary John Fernandes (born 22 October 1937) is a Kenyan field hockey player. He competed at the 1960, 1964 and the 1968 Summer Olympics. He is the brother of Kenyan hockey international Leo Fernandes.

References

External links
 

1937 births
Living people
Kenyan male field hockey players
Olympic field hockey players of Kenya
Field hockey players at the 1960 Summer Olympics
Field hockey players at the 1964 Summer Olympics
Field hockey players at the 1968 Summer Olympics
Sportspeople from Nairobi
Kenyan people of Indian descent
Kenyan people of Goan descent
20th-century Kenyan people